The 1940–41 season was the 42nd season in the history of Berner Sport Club Young Boys. The team played their home games at Stadion Wankdorf in Bern.

Overview
Young Boys achieved a second-place finish and reached the semi-finals of the Swiss Cup where they lost to Geneva-based Servette FC.

Players
 Maurice Glur
 Achille Siegrist
 Louis Gobet
 Otto Hänni
 Ernst Siegenthaler
 Cuany
 Hans Stegmeier
 Fritz Knecht
 Hans Trachsel
 Willy Terretaz
 Olivier Eggimann

Competitions

Overall record

Nationalliga

League table

Matches

Swiss Cup

References

BSC Young Boys seasons
Swiss football clubs 1940–41 season